Muhammad Taqiuddin bin Cheman is a Malaysian politician from AMANAH. He was the Member of Johor State Legislative Assembly for Pulai Sebatang from 2018 to 2022.

Education 
He has a Diploma in Management and is a Bachelor of Business Administration from Kolej Pengajian Islam Johor (MARSAH).

Politics 
He is currently the Director of the Youth Election Bureau of AMANAH and the Youth Chief of PH and AMANAH Johor. He was the Member of Johor State Legislative Assembly for Pulai Sebatang from 2018 to 2022. He has also contested in the 2022 Johor state election for the Mahkota seat but lost to the UMNO candidate,Sharifah Azizah Syed Zain.

Election result

Family 
He is the son of PAS politician, Cheman Yusoh, who had contested in the 2018 Johor state election for the Sungai Balang state seat.

Reference 

People from Johor
National Trust Party (Malaysia) politicians
Members of the Johor State Legislative Assembly
Malaysian people of Malay descent
Living people
1988 births